The Great Comet of 1556 (designated C/1556 D1 in modern nomenclature) was a comet that first appeared in February 1556, and which was observed throughout much of Europe. The comet appears to have been seen in some places before the end of February, but it was not generally observed until the middle of the first week in March. Its apparent diameter was equal to half that of the Moon, and the tail was said  to resemble "the flame of a torch agitated by the wind." Cornelius Gemma (the son of Gemma Frisius) said that the head of the comet, when it first appeared, was as large as Jupiter, and that its color resembled that of Mars.

The course of the comet of 1556 was observed by Paul Fabricius, a mathematician and physician at the court of Charles V, Holy Roman Emperor.

Charles V comet 

The Great Comet of 1556 is called the comet of Charles V. When the Emperor first caught sight of it he stood aghast, and exclaimed: "By this dread sign my fates do summon me". Charles had long meditated about retiring from the world after his conquests. Regarding the comet as a sign of Heaven's command to do so, he hastened towards the peaceful monastery of St. Juste, Placentia.

An anonymous English treatise on "Blazing Stares" (1618) spoke of the comet as follows :

Contemporary religious interpretation
The Portuguese  Dominican friar Gaspar da Cruz, who visited Guangzhou in 1556, associated the comet with the devastating 1556 Shaanxi earthquake. In his 1569 book he wondered if the comet was a sign of calamities not just for China, but for the entire world – and could be even the sign of the birth of Antichrist.

Alleged connection to the Great Comet of 1264 

Grounding his calculations upon elements deduced from Conrad Wolfhardt's chart along with some other crude data gathered from old records, and comparing the result he obtained with the account given by Friar Giles of Cambridge of a grand comet which appeared in 1264, John Russell Hind was led to conclude, as Richard Dunthorne had been in the previous century, that the comet of Charles V was that of 1264 returned. At any rate, he found a high degree of probability in favor of the conclusion at which he had arrived, and argued that the bodies of these years were identical. Hence he concluded that a return to perihelion might be looked for about the middle of the 19th century, 1848 to 1850. This prediction failed, and as of 2009 no observed comet has matched the orbital elements of either comet. David A. Sargent writes that available evidence points to there being no connection between the comets of 1264 and 1556.

References

Notes
 
 

Non-periodic comets
1556 in science
15560227
Great comets